Sir Roger John Edward Conant, 1st Baronet, CVO, DL (28 May 1899 – 30 March 1973) was a Conservative Party politician in the United Kingdom. He was a Member of Parliament (MP) for more than 25 years between 1931 and 1959.

Born in Kensington, London, he was an unsuccessful candidate in the Chesterfield constituency at the 1929 general election, but won the seat at the 1931 general election when the Labour Party split over Ramsay MacDonald's formation of the National Government.

He lost the Chesterfield seat at the 1935 general election, but after the retirement in 1937 of Stanley Baldwin, he was returned to Parliament at a by-election for Baldwin's Bewdley constituency in Worcestershire.  He held the seat until its abolition for the 1950 general election, when he was elected as MP for Rutland and Stamford.

Appointed a Commander of the Royal Victorian Order (CVO) in the 1953 Coronation Honours, Conant was created a baronet on 30 June 1954.

Sir Roger retired from the House of Commons at the 1959 general election. He died in 1973 in Chelsea.

Arms

References

External links 
 

1899 births
1973 deaths
Conant family
Conant, Roger Conant, 1st Baronet
Commanders of the Royal Victorian Order
Conservative Party (UK) MPs for English constituencies
Deputy Lieutenants of Rutland
People from Rutland
UK MPs 1931–1935
UK MPs 1935–1945
UK MPs 1945–1950
UK MPs 1950–1951
UK MPs 1951–1955
UK MPs 1955–1959
Ministers in the third Churchill government, 1951–1955